Ruth Stone (June 8, 1915 – November 19, 2011) was an award-winning American poet.

Life and poetry
Stone was born in Roanoke, Virginia and lived there until age 6, when her family moved back to her parents' hometown of Indianapolis, Indiana. She went to college at the University of Illinois. Her first marriage was to John Clapp in 1935, and they had one daughter. Her second marriage was to professor and poet Walter Stone, in 1944, with whom she had two daughters. Walter Stone, who served in World War II, received a PhD from Harvard, and taught at University of Illinois, and then at Vassar College. Walter Stone committed suicide in 1959; this tragedy shaped the path of Ruth Stone's life, as she sought ways to support herself and her daughters by teaching poetry at universities across the United States.

Her work is distinguished by its tendency to draw imagery and language from the natural sciences.

Stone died at her home in Goshen, Vermont, on November 19, 2011. She was buried near the raspberry bushes behind her Goshen home.

Career
Stone's verse was published widely in periodicals, and she was the author of thirteen books of poetry.

In 1990 Stone became a professor of English and Creative Writing at Binghamton University, and retired from this position at the age of 85.

Early on, Stone's work was recognized by editors. While her husband was teaching at Vassar College, Stone received the Kenyon Review Fellowship in Poetry.

House in Goshen, Vermont 
When Stone received the Kenyon Review Fellowship in Poetry, she and Walter used the funds to buy a house in Goshen, Vermont, expecting that it would be a place to go in the summers, and to eventually retire.  The house became a refuge for Stone after Walter's death, and over the years, became an intellectual center for her students and other poets.

Awards 

Poetry Magazine Bess Hoken Prize, 1953

Kenyon Review Fellowship in Poetry, 1956

Radcliffe Institute Fellowship, 1963-1965

Guggenheim Fellowship, Poetry, 1971

Guggenheim Fellowship, Poetry, 1975

Delmore Schwartz Award, 1983

Whiting Award, 1986

Paterson Poetry Prize, 1988

Cerf Lifetime Achievement Award, State of Vermont

Shelley Memorial Award.Eric Mathieu King Award, Academy of American Poets

National Book Award for In the Next Galaxy, 2002

Wallace Stevens Award, Academy of American Poets, 2002

Poet Laureate of Vermont, 2007

Finalist, Pulitzer Prize for Poetry for What Love Comes To: New and Selected Poems,  2009

Legacy
Stone's long-time residence in Goshen, Vermont was listed on the National Register of Historic Places in 2016.  Her heirs (both literary and family) — including her granddaughter, poet and visual artist Bianca Stone — have established a foundation to convert the property into a writer's retreat.

Paintbrush: A Journal of Poetry and Translation 27 (2000/2001) was devoted entirely to Stone's work.

The Ruth Stone Poetry Prize awarded by The Vermont College of Fine Arts and their literary journal Hunger Mountain is in its sixth year.

Stone's daughters Phoebe Stone and Abigail Stone, and her granddaughter Bianca Stone, are all published writers.

Cultural references 
The voice of Ruth Stone reading her poem "Be Serious" is featured in the film USA The Movie.

A documentary film by Nora Jacobson, Ruth Stone's Vast Library of the Female Mind, was released in 2022.

Bibliography
What Love Comes To: New and Selected Poems, Bloodaxe Books, UK edition, 2009, 
 —finalist for the 2009 Pulitzer Prize
; Copper Canyon Press, 2007, 
 winner of the National Book Award
Ordinary Words, Paris Press, 2000,  winner of the National Book Critics Circle Award
Simplicity, Paris Press, 1996, 
Who is the Widow's Muse?, Yellow Moon Press, 1991, 
The Solution Alembic Press, Ltd., 1989, 
Second Hand Coat: Poems New and Selected 1987; Yellow Moon Press, 1991, 
American Milk, From Here Press, 1986, 
Cheap: New Poems and Ballads, Harcourt Brace Jovanovich, 1975, 
Unknown Messages Nemesis Press, 1973
Topography and Other Poems Harcourt Brace Jovanovich, 1971, 
In an Iridescent Time, Harcourt, Brace, 1959

Archive 
Ruth Stone's papers reside at the Albert and Shirley Small Special Collections Library at the University of Virginia

References

External links
Ruth Stone Foundation
Ruth Stone Biog and audio files from the Poetry Foundation
Ruth Stone from the Academy of American Poets
Profile at The Whiting Foundation
"What Love Comes To", Joe Ahearn, Cold Front, September 3, 2008
"The Imagined Galaxies of Ruth Stone", NPR
"Ruth Stone", Narrative Magazine
"On the Road to Paradise: An Interview with Ruth Stone", The Drunken Boat, Rebecca Seiferle
TED - Elizabeth Gilbert talks about the way Ruth Stone has "caught" poems that were "searching" for an author
In Memoriam of Ruth Stone, written by her daughter Abigail Stone from THEthe Poetry Blog
, September 2008

National Book Award winners
Poets Laureate of Vermont
Poets from Vermont
Poets from Virginia
People from Goshen, Vermont
Writers from Roanoke, Virginia
1915 births
2011 deaths
American women poets
20th-century American poets
20th-century American women writers
Binghamton University faculty
American women academics
21st-century American women